Namdalseid Church is a parish church of the Church of Norway in Namsos municipality in Trøndelag county, Norway. It is located in the village of Namdalseid, along Norwegian County Road 17. It is the church for the Namdalseid parish which is part of the Namdal prosti (deanery) in the Diocese of Nidaros. The white, wooden church was built in a long church style in 1858 using plans drawn up by the architect Christian Heinrich Grosch. The church seats about 350 people.

History
The earliest existing historical records of the church date back to the year 1589, but the church was likely built during the 14th century. Around the year 1690, the old church burned down. It was rebuilt around the year 1702. The name of the parish was changed from Elda to Aas by a royal resolution on 30 December 1853. At the same time, the parish was authorized to move the church location from Elda to Aas, just outside the village of Namdalseid. After the new church was completed, the old church at Elda was torn down. The new church was designed by Christian Heinrich Grosch, and the builder was Rasmus Overrein. The church was consecrated on 19 August 1858. A royal resolution from 10 July 1894 changed the name of the parish from Aas to Namdalseid, the name of the municipality in which it was located.

See also
List of churches in Nidaros

References

Namsos
Churches in Trøndelag
Long churches in Norway
Wooden churches in Norway
19th-century Church of Norway church buildings
Churches completed in 1858
14th-century establishments in Norway